Gastropodidae is a family of rotifers belonging to the order Ploima.

Genera
 Ascomorpha Perty, 1850
 Gastropus Imhof, 1898

References

 O'Reilly, M. (2001). Rotifera, in: Costello, M.J. et al. (Ed.) (2001). European register of marine species: a check-list of the marine species in Europe and a bibliography of guides to their identification. Collection Patrimoines Naturels, 50: pp. 149–151

Ploima
Rotifer families